Cumby Independent School District is a public school district based in Cumby, Texas (USA). It serves sections of Hopkins County and Hunt County.

In 2009, the school district was rated "academically acceptable" by the Texas Education Agency.

Schools 
Cumby Elementary
Cumby High School

See also

List of school districts in Texas

References

External links
Cumby ISD

School districts in Hopkins County, Texas
School districts in Hunt County, Texas